Shilanga is a part of Kibera slum in Nairobi. It has at least one church. It has a major Luo population. Other parts of Kibera include Laini Saba, Lindi, Makina, Kianda, Gatwekera, Soweto East, Kichinjio, Kisumu Ndogo, Makongeni and Mashimoni.

See also 
Raila
Sarang'ombe 
Siranga

References

Suburbs of Nairobi
Slums in Kenya